Mike Hedden (born December 27, 1984) is a Canadian former professional ice hockey forward who played in the American Hockey League (AHL). He is currently serving as an assistant coach with the Oshawa Generals of the Ontario Hockey League (OHL).

Playing career
Prior to turning professional, Hedden played college hockey at Neumann University. Hedden made his professional debut in the ECHL with the Toledo Walleye in the 2009–10 season.

After impressing with the Walleye, Hedden earned a try-out contract with American Hockey League clubs, Grand Rapids Griffins, Rockford IceHogs and the Rochester Americans. In the following 2011–12 season, he signed a one-year contract with the Texas Stars.

Hedden established himself alongside the Stars top offensive players, culminating in capturing the Calder Cup in his third and final season with the club in the 2013–14 season.

On June 20, 2014, Hedden signed his first European contract, agreeing to a one-year deal with Croatian club, KHL Medveščak Zagreb of the Kontinental Hockey League. In the 2014–15 season, Hedden struggled to transition with Zagreb going scoreless in 12 games before he was released from his contract. On October 30, Hedden moved to the Finnish Liiga, signing for the remainder of the season with Ässät Pori.

On May 25, 2015, Hedden left Finland as a free agent, continuing his European career in Germany, signing an initial one-year deal with the Straubing Tigers of the Deutsche Eishockey Liga.

After three seasons in the DEL with Straubing, Hedden left as a free agent to sign a one-year deal with the Cardiff Devils of the Elite Ice Hockey League on July 8, 2018.

Following five European seasons abroad, Hedden returned to North America as a free agent and agreed to play in the ECHL in signing a one-year deal with the Allen Americans on July 9, 2019. He began the 2019–20 season by appearing in 4 games with the Americans before he was claimed off waivers by the Jacksonville Icemen on October 29, 2019.

On August 6, 2020, Hedden continued in the ECHL, agreeing to a one-year deal with the Rapid City Rush. After he was named in the Rush training camp roster, Hedden opted to end his 11-year professional career announcing his retirement on December 1, 2020. A little over a month later, Hedden reversed his decision to retire, returning the Rapid City Rush on January 10, 2021.

In 2021, he was named an assistant coach of the Oshawa Generals in the Ontario Hockey League.

Career statistics

Awards and honours

References

External links

1984 births
Allen Americans players
Ässät players
Canadian ice hockey forwards
Cardiff Devils players
Grand Rapids Griffins players
Jacksonville Icemen players
KHL Medveščak Zagreb players
Living people
Rapid City Rush players
Rochester Americans players
Rockford IceHogs (AHL) players
Straubing Tigers players
Texas Stars players
Toledo Walleye players
Canadian expatriate ice hockey players in the United States
Canadian expatriate ice hockey players in Wales
Canadian expatriate ice hockey players in Finland
Canadian expatriate ice hockey players in Germany
Canadian expatriate ice hockey players in Croatia